Friedrich Tinner, also known as Fred Tinner (born 1936), was a Swiss nuclear engineer and a long-associated friend of Abdul Qadeer Khan—Pakistan's former top scientist—and connected with the Khan nuclear network trafficking in the proliferation of nuclear materials and gas centrifuge designs to Iran, Libya, and North Korea. In 2006, Tinner was revealed by the IAEA's investigators as the foreign director and technical head of the Libyan nuclear program. In Libya, Tinner ran the illicit nuclear experiments, using the expertise and technical information he received from his friend Khan, on behalf of the Libyan nuclear program. According to Khan, Tinner was the former researcher of the Kahuta Research Laboratories during the 1970s, when he worked there as a research scientist under the supervision of A. Q. Khan. Tinner is known and has been connected in particular with gas centrifuge technology used for isotopic enrichment of uranium.

Education 
Friedrich Tinner was born in Bern, Switzerland, in 1936 to a Swiss family. He received his early and intermediate education there at Bern where he studied science and per-mathematical courses at a local school. In 1961, Tinner went to Belgium to attend a technical university to study engineering and attended Katholieke Universiteit Leuven. During this time, Abdul Qadeer Khan was also studying for his master's degree in engineering. It was Tinner's college life when he met with Khan and befriended with him in short time. Tinner and Khan studied at Leuven and stayed in a same dorm room. Tinner received his Master of Science in Nuclear engineering and took a government assignment in Vienna. Even after Khan moved to Netherlands as he joined the URENCO Group, Tinner continued his close association with Khan. After his college years, Tinner went on to work for International Atomic Energy Agency (IAEA) and was made responsible for uranium reactor for the purpose of power generation. Throughout this time, Tinner kept close contact with Dr. A. Q. Khan.

Nuclear proliferation
There are many controversial media and intelligence reports that Friedrich Tinner and his sons, Urs and Marco Tinner, have lived for a long time in Pakistan, where they  have worked for Khan Labs as research associates under the supervision of Abdul Qadeer Khan. According to the New York Times, Tinner had a long and close relationship with A. Q. Khan. Tinner and Dr. Khan were college friends in Belgium where they studied together. Tinner, who was working at International Atomic Energy Agency as a uranium expert in the 1980s, resigned from his job and moved to Pakistan, along with his family, where he joined Khan's KRL in early 1980s. The Swiss news agency also reported that Tinner had been working with Dr. Abdul Qadir Khan in mid-1970s, using his expertise in vacuum technology to develop atomic centrifuges.

However, Khan maintained that Khan first met with Tinner in 1976 when Khan and Tinner were placing sensitive projects for the Vakuum-Apparate-Technik (VAT) (English: Vacuum Apparatus Technology). A competent nuclear engineer, Tinner left VAT and traveled to Pakistan quite often as he was employed at Khan's Engineering Research Laboratories (ERL). Tinner resided with Khan and his family where, at ERL, Tinner performed experiments under Khan's supervision. However, in the 1980s, Tinner was invited by Colonel Muammar Gaddafi to join and head the Libyan nuclear program. Throughout the 1980s, Tinner tried to maintain the Libyan nuclear program and performed illicit and illegal experiments. However, Tinner again left for Pakistan and the program was dismantled. In 1995, Tinner again returned to Libya with the documentation provided by Khan. Following his return, Tinner became technical directorate officer of Libyan nuclear program, using Khan's expertise to develop the centrifuges. However, due to Libya's academic progress and lack of technicians, the program could not prevail and suffered many setbacks. In 2000, Khan provided sensitive centrifuge designs to Tinner on gas-centrifuge method. But due to its complexity and difficulty, Tinner was unable to establish the gas-cetrifuge program for Libyan nuclear program, therefore, Colonel Gaddafi dismantled and rolled back the program. In 2004, Libya dismantled its program and provided its technical and nuclear materials to IAEA and the United States. Libyan revelations also led the arrest of its former head of the program, Friederich Tinner. In Pakistan, Abdul Qadeer Khan was debriefed by the Pakistan Armed Forces which continued until next 4 years.

Arrest and allegations 

His then 43-year-old son Urs Tinner was in custody for four years around 2004 as a suspect in the same network. His brother, Marco Tinner, was also in custody for three years on similar charges.

In May, the President of the Swiss Confederation, Pascal Couchepin, announced that the Tinner files, believed to number around 30,000 documents, had been shredded. This was justified to avoid them, "getting into the hands of a terrorist organisation or an unauthorised state", according to Couchepin. However it is alleged that this was a cover-up, to hide the involvement of Urs Tinner with the CIA. Although the Swiss government claimed that the shredding was a security requirement of the IAEA as a measure against nuclear proliferation, it is widely alleged that this was done solely under American pressure, either to hide their involvement or to avoid damage to their own propaganda. Swiss senator Dick Marty has questioned the need for their destruction, pointing out that they could merely have been held secret.

In 2012, all three were released from jail. Marco was sentenced to 41 months in prison, Urs 50 months and their father was given a 24-month suspended sentence. They were released immediately on the basis of time already served.

See also 
 Asher Karni
 Abdul Qadeer Khan

References

Further reading 
 
 LES refers to Louisiana Energy Services
 

Swiss nuclear engineers
Swiss engineers
Nuclear proliferation
Weapons scientists and engineers
Project-706
1936 births
Living people
KU Leuven alumni
Swiss expatriates in Pakistan
People from Bern
Nuclear weapons programme of Pakistan
Nuclear technology in Libya